Eotettix is a genus of spur-throated grasshoppers in the family Acrididae. There are about 6 described species in Eotettix.

Species
 E. davisi Hebard, 1918
 E. hebardi Rehn, 1906
 E. palustris Morse, 1904 (little swamp grasshopper)
 E. pusillus Morse, 1904 (little eastern grasshopper)
 E. quercicola Hebard, 1918
 E. signatus Scudder, 1897 (handsome Florida grasshopper)

References

 Brunke A, Majka C (2010). "The adventive genus Xantholinus Dejean (Coleoptera, Staphylinidae, Staphylininae in North America: new records and a synthesis of distributional data". . ZooKeys 65: 51-61.
 Capinera J.L, Scott R.D., Walker T.J. (2004). Field Guide to Grasshoppers, Katydids, and Crickets of the United States. Cornell University Press.
 Otte, Daniel (1995). "Grasshoppers [Acridomorpha] C". Orthoptera Species File 4, 518.

Further reading

 

Melanoplinae